Randolph B. Wood (born October 12, 1963) is an American former professional ice hockey left winger who played twelve seasons in the National Hockey League (NHL) for the New York Islanders, Buffalo Sabres, Toronto Maple Leafs and Dallas Stars.

Career
Wood's father Norman was the coach of the Princeton University hockey team from 1959 to 1965. He was born in Princeton, New Jersey and raised in Manchester-by-the-Sea, Massachusetts. Before joining the AHL, Randy played hockey at Yale University for three years.

In 1986–87, Wood joined the AHL team, Springfield Indians and scored 47 points over 75 games. He was called up to the New York Islanders during that time where he scored only one goal over six games. He routinely was sent down and called back up over the next three years until he became a solid spot on the roster from 1988 to 1992, where he then got traded to the Buffalo Sabres. After spending three seasons in Buffalo, Wood was claimed off waivers by the Toronto Maple Leafs, got traded to the Dallas Stars, and then for the last season of his career he was sent back to the Islanders.

Personal life

Wood's two sons are also ice hockey players. Tyler is playing with ERC Sonthofen in the German league Oberliga, while Miles is playing for the New Jersey Devils of the National Hockey League (NHL). Miles was drafted 100th overall by New Jersey Devils in the 2013 NHL Entry Draft.

Career statistics

Regular season and playoffs

International

Awards and honors

References

External links
 

1963 births
Living people
American men's ice hockey left wingers
Buffalo Sabres players
Dallas Stars players
Ice hockey players from Massachusetts
New York Islanders players
People from Manchester-by-the-Sea, Massachusetts
Sportspeople from Essex County, Massachusetts
Springfield Indians players
Toronto Maple Leafs players
Undrafted National Hockey League players
Yale Bulldogs men's ice hockey players
Ice hockey players from New Jersey
AHCA Division I men's ice hockey All-Americans